Greg Ford (born 9 May 1992) is an Irish cricketer, and the son of Graham Ford, the head coach of the Ireland cricket team. He made his List A debut on 17 September 2020, for Leinster Lightning in the 2020 Inter-Provincial Cup. He made his Twenty20 debut on 27 August 2020, for Leinster Lightning in the 2020 Inter-Provincial Trophy. Ford's brother, Matt, also plays cricket for Munster Reds.

References

External links
 

1992 births
Living people
Irish cricketers
Leinster Lightning cricketers
Munster Reds cricketers
Cricketers from Pietermaritzburg